Sonal Dinusha (born 4 December 2000) is a Sri Lankan cricketer. He made his first-class debut for Colombo Cricket Club in the 2018–19 Premier League Tournament on 30 November 2018. He made his List A debut for Colombo Cricket Club in the 2018–19 Premier Limited Overs Tournament on 10 March 2019. In January 2020, he was named in Sri Lanka's squad for the 2020 Under-19 Cricket World Cup. He made his Twenty20 debut on 4 March 2021, for Colombo Cricket Club in the 2020–21 SLC Twenty20 Tournament.

References

External links
 

2000 births
Living people
Sri Lankan cricketers
Colombo Cricket Club cricketers
Place of birth missing (living people)